Bear Rock Lakes Wildlife Management Area is a  protected area located in Ohio County, West Virginia, about  east of Wheeling. The terrain at Bear Rock Lakes is rolling hills covered by a combination of hardwood forest and open fields.

From Valley Grove on U.S. Route 40, turn south on Valley Grove Road. Follow Valley Grove Road about a mile. Immediately after passing underneath I-70, turn left on Bear Rock Lane. Follow Bear Rock Lane to the wildlife area.

Hunting and Fishing
Hunting opportunities include rabbit, waterfowl, deer, squirrel, and turkey.  The WMA contains four fishing lakes,  Bear Lake,  Rock Lake,  Baker Lake, and   Wood Pond. Fishing opportunities in the Bear Rock Lakes include stocked trout, largemouth bass, bluegill and channel catfish.  Bear Lake has a handicapped accessible fishing trail.  Boating, with electric motors only, is permitted on Bear Lake.  Wood Pond is designated for Class Q licences only.  Fishing with minnows is prohibited.

See also

Animal conservation
List of West Virginia wildlife management areas
Recreational fishing

References

External links
West Virginia Division of Natural Resources web site
West Virginia Hunting Regulations
West Virginia Fishing Regulations
WVDNR Map of Bear Rock Lakes Wildlife Management Area

Protected areas of Ohio County, West Virginia
Wildlife management areas of West Virginia
IUCN Category V